Triunfo may refer to:

Places
Brazil
 Triunfo, Paraíba – municipality in Paraíba
 Triunfo, Pernambuco – municipality in Pernambuco
 Triunfo, Rio Grande do Sul – municipality in Rio Grande do Sul
 Triunfo Potiguar – municipality in Rio Grande do Norte
 Barão do Triunfo – municipality in Rio Grande do Sul
 Novo Triunfo – municipality in Bahia
 São João do Triunfo – municipality in Paraná

United States
 Triunfo, California – defunct settlement now located near present-day Thousand Oaks, California

Publications
 Triunfo – magazine published in Spain

See also
 El Triunfo (disambiguation)